The Willy-Brandt-Platz is a central square in Frankfurt am Main, Hesse, Germany. Its name was Theaterplatz (Theatre square) until 1992, when it was named after Willy Brandt, the former chancellor. It is located between the Main Station and the Altstadt, at the Frankfurter Anlagenring, and is part of the so-called Bankenviertel. Major buildings are the Städtisches Opern- und Schauspielhaus, the municipal theatre that opened in 1963, and the Eurotower skyscraper. Below the square are the U-Bahnhof Willy-Brandt-Platz and the Theatertunnel street tunnel.

History 

The square was the location of a city gate to the West, the Neues Galgentor. The fortifications were demolished in 1809. The former fortifications were replaced by a park called Wallanlagen. When the theatre (Schauspielhaus) was completed in 1902, the square was named Theaterplatz. It was renamed again in 1992 to honour Willy Brandt.

Description 

The square is open for pedestrians, the tram, cars, and the U-Bahn below it. Cars were preferred, which led to less flexibility for other parties. The building of the Theatertunnel in 1974 helped to reduce car traffic significantly.

From 2004, when an underground parking lot below the square was completed, it was remodelled to ensure accessibility for handicapped people of public institutions. At the same time, a new lighting system was installed.

In the Gallusanlage, north of the square, one of two copies of the monumental sculpture Euro-Skulptur by Ottmar Hörl dominates the park. The -high, 50-ton sculpture, consisting of a blue euro sign surrounded by twelve yellow stars representing the first member nations of the European Union, is illuminated at night by 330 neon light strips. The acrylic glass sculpture was installed in 2001.

U-Bahnhof 

At the U-Bahn station , lines of the Strecke A (U1, U2, U3 und U8) and Strecke B (U4 and U5) connect.

Notes

References

External links 

 U-Bahn-Station "Willy-Brandt-Platz": VGF und Stadtplanungsamt gestalten Eingang vor dem Schauspielhaus neu vgf-ffm.de, 28 December 2009
 U-Bahn-Zugang am Willy-Brandt-Platz in Frankfurt baunetzwissen.de

Squares in Frankfurt